Yann Le Pennec (born 27 November 1974 in Paimpol) is a French slalom canoeist who competed at the international level from 1992 to 2006.

He won two medals in the C2 team event at the ICF Canoe Slalom World Championships with a gold in 2002 and a bronze in 1999. He also has two silvers and two bronzes from the same event from the European Championships.

Le Pennec finished fifth in the C2 event at the 2004 Summer Olympics in Athens.

His partner in the boat throughout his C2 career was Philippe Quémerais.

World Cup individual podiums

References

1974 births
Canoeists at the 2004 Summer Olympics
French male canoeists
Living people
Olympic canoeists of France
Medalists at the ICF Canoe Slalom World Championships